This is a list of films produced and/or distributed by Lionsgate. Since 1997, about 400 films have been released. As of November 2017, Lionsgate's films grossed approximately $8.2 billion.

References

External links
Lionsgate Publicity website
Upcoming Movies from Lionsgate at Box Office Mojo
Lionsgate Box Office History at The Numbers

Lionsgate
Lionsgate